Clueless (also known as Clueless, The Musical) is a jukebox musical with a book by Amy Heckerling based on her 1995 film of the same name, itself loosely based on Jane Austen's 1815 novel Emma, updating the setting to modern-day Beverly Hills.<ref>[http://www.jasna.org/persuasions/on-line/opno3/mazmanian.html Mazmanian, Melissa. "Reviving Emma" in a Clueless World: The Current Attraction to a Classic Structure.] Persuasions Online: Occasional Papers No. 3. Fall 1999. Jane Austen Society of North America website. Accessed November 12, 2013.</ref> The musical premiered Off-Broadway on November 20, 2018, with an official opening on December 11, in the Pershing Square Signature Center's Alice Griffin Jewel Box Theatre. Performances ran through January 12, 2019. While financially successful, critical reception was mixed to negative in comparison to other teen movie musicals and to the movie. No other productions have been announced so far.

As a non-traditional jukebox musical, the show uses '80s and '90s songs as the entire score, with lyric changes to fit the scene. It features classics such as "Torn" by Natalie Imbruglia, "Say My Name" by Destiny's Child, "Kids in America" by Kim Wilde, and "Beautiful Life" by Ace of Base.

Productions
Off-Broadway (2018)
The musical opened Off-Broadway at The Pershing Square Signature Center, produced by The New Group, on November 20, 2018, for a limited engagement until January 12, 2019. The production was directed by Kristin Hanggi, choreographed by Kelly Devine and the show's music supervision, arrangements and orchestration was provided by Ethan Popp. The production's design team included scenery by Beowulf Boritt, costumes by Amy Clark, lighting by Jason Lyons, sound by Gareth Owen, and projections by Darrel Maloney.

 Characters and original cast 

 Musical numbers 

 Act I 
 "Beautiful Life" - Cher and Ensemble
 "Shoop" - Murray and Male Ensemble
 "Little Miss Can't Be Wrong" - Cher, Josh, Teachers and Female Ensemble
 "No Scrubs" - Cher and Ensemble
 "You Gotta Be" - Cher, Dionne and Ensemble
 "How Am I Supposed to Live Without You" - Mr.Hall, Miss Geist, Cher and Dionne and Ensemble
 "U Can't Touch This" - Company
 "Supermodel" - Cher, Dionne, Tai and Ensemble
 "Barbie Girl" - Cher, Dionne, Tai, Murray and Female Ensemble
 "Groove Is In The Heart" - Tai, Murray and Company
 "Torn" - Cher and Josh

 Act II 
 "My Lovin' (You're Never Gonna Get It)" - Tai, Cher, Dionne and Female Ensemble
 "A Girl Like You" - Christian, Cher, Dionne, Tai and Ensemble
 "Dammit" - Cher, Josh, The Band and Ensemble
 "Dammit (Reprise)" - Cher and Josh
 "Bye Bye Bye" -  Cher, Christian and Company
 "Mmmm Mmmm Mmmm Mmmm" - Travis
 "What's Up?" - Cher
 "She's So High" - Cher and Josh
 "You Get What You Give" - Cher and Company
 "Kids in America" - Full Company

 Critical response Clueless, The Musical received mixed reviews. Frank Rizzo of Variety called the narrative "lightweight" but praised the overall look and tone of the show. Rizzo, describing Kelly Devine's choreography, said "its teen-energy moves are a constant pleasure". Rizzo also said that "Beowulf Boritt’s design essentials are rad and Amy Clark’s costumes recall the too-cool-to-care designs of the period and its stylish plaids and pleats". Rizzo also praised the music selection for show, calling Amy Heckerling's reworking of the lyrics "crafty".

David Rooney of The Hollywood Reporter found the show "hit-or-miss". Rooney praised that the show stuck closely to the original's plot but criticized that there was no element of surprise. Rooney wrote that "in comparison to other teen classics retooled for the stage, like Mean Girls, Heathers: The Musical or Bring It On'', the show rarely steps out from the shadow of its screen source with anything new to offer."

References

External links
Clueless, The Musical at Internet Off-Broadway Database

2018 musicals
Jukebox musicals
Teen musicals
Plays set in the 1990s
Plays set in the United States
Musicals based on films
Musicals based on multiple works
Off-Broadway musicals